Fitchburg is a city in northern Worcester County, Massachusetts, United States. The third-largest city in the county, its population was 41,946 at the 2020 census. Fitchburg is home to Fitchburg State University as well as 17 public and private elementary and high schools.

History 

Fitchburg was first settled in by Europeans in 1730 as part of Lunenburg, and was officially set apart from that town and incorporated in 1764. The area was previously occupied by the Nipmuc tribe. It is named for John Fitch, one of the committee that procured the act of incorporation. In July 1748 Fitch and his family, living in this isolated spot, were abducted to Canada by Native Americans, but returned the next year.

Fitchburg is situated on both the Nashua River and a railroad line. The original Fitchburg Railroad ran through the Hoosac Tunnel, linking Boston and Albany, New York. The tunnel was built using the Burleigh Rock Drill, designed and built in Fitchburg. Fitchburg was a 19th-century industrial center. Originally operated by water power, large mills produced machines, tools, clothing, paper, and firearms. The city is noted for its architecture, particularly in the Victorian style, built at the height of its mill town prosperity. A few examples of these 19th century buildings are the Fay Club, the old North Worcester County Courthouse and the Bullock house.

As the city is one of Worcester County's two shire towns, it has hosted the Northern Worcester County Registry of Deeds, established in 1903, and the county jail on Water Street.

The 1961 film Return to Peyton Place was filmed in Fitchburg.

Geography
Fitchburg is located at  (42.578689, −71.803383).

The city is drained by the Nashua River.

Fitchburg is bordered by Ashby to the north, Lunenburg to the east, Leominster to the south, Westminster to the west, and a small portion of Ashburnham to the northwest.

Neighborhoods
Fitchburg is divided into multiple different neighborhoods/villages, including:

 Cleghorn
 Crockerville
 College Area
 Downtown Fitchburg
 East Side
 Green Acres Village
 North Fitchburg
 The Patch
 Prichard-Pleasant Street
 South Fitchburg
 Tar Hill
 Upper Common
 Waite's Corner
 West Fitchburg

Climate
Fitchburg's climate is humid continental, which is the predominant climate for Massachusetts and New England. Summers are typically warm, rainy, and humid, while winters are cold, windy, and snowy. Spring and fall are usually mild, but conditions are widely varied, depending on wind direction and jet stream positioning. The warmest month is July, with an average high temperature of about 81 °F and an average low temperature of about 61 °F. The coldest month is January, with an average high temperature of about 34 °F and an average low temperature of about 15 °F.

Points of interest

Fitchburg Art Museum

The museum was founded in 1925 through the bequest of artist, collector and Fitchburg native Eleanor Norcross (1854–1923). The museum's four building complex features over 20,000 square feet of gallery and educational workshop space and includes the historic "Cross Barn" built in 1883, and the Simond's building completed in 1989. 12 galleries feature American, European, African, Egyptian, Greek, Roman, Asian, and Pre-Columbian art.

Rollstone Boulder

Fitchburg is noted for the "Rollstone Boulder", a 110-ton specimen of porphyritic granite, which is in a small triangular park adjacent to the city green. The boulder was a feature of the summit of Rollstone Hill; it was exploded and reassembled on the green in 1929 and 1930.

Crocker Field

Listed on the National Register of Historic Places, this athletic facility was a gift of Alva Crocker, in 1918, to the City Of Fitchburg's school children. Alvah Crocker hired the famous Olmsted Brothers Landscaping and Design Firm of Brookline, MA to design his "field of dreams." Babe Ruth once visited Crocker field and asked Clarence Amiott, then the Fitchburg High School Athletic Director, "What professional team plays here?" to which Mr. Amiott answered "The Fitchburg High School teams."

Fitchburg Historical Society

The Society houses more than 200,000 items related to the history of Fitchburg. Included in the archives are original Sentinel newspapers from 1838 to 1976, city directories, photographs, scrapbooks, manuscripts, family genealogies, postcards, files on industries in the City, and books and pamphlets on Fitchburg's history from the 1700s to the present. In addition there is an extensive Civil War collection and a collection on the railroad. The Research Library is open to the public.

The Society also has a remarkable collection of artifacts which tell the story of Fitchburg—early iron hearth cooking tools, the first printing press of the Fitchburg Sentinel, machines illustrating the strong industrial heritage of the City, a stellar collection of early paintings, and clothing representing many decades in Fitchburg.
A comprehensive strategic plan completed in 2001 pointed out a need to find a building better suited our needs in order to continue collecting and preserving the history of Fitchburg and conducting programs for students and the general public. The Historical Society is now in the final stages of renovation and upgrading our building located at 781 Main Street.  As a result of the renovations to the H. M. Francis Phoenix Building the Society has moved to its new location of 781 Main Street.

Coggshall Park
Coggshall Park is a Victorian park with miles of wooded trails branching out from around Mirror Lake, which is encircled by a walking path. Stone steps built into a hillside face a gazebo on the water, making this a popular spot for weddings and photos. A classic stone house on the property overlooks Mirror Lake. The tables and benches scattered around the park draw picnickers as well as those simply seeking a place to relax. A playground sits adjacent to the pond and a disc golf course.

Coggshall Park was a gift to the City from Mr. Henry Coggshall, an executive of The Fitchburg Gas Company, and his wife in 1894. The initial donation included , but the couple subsequently purchased and donated additional parcels to create the 212-acre park that exists today.

The Friends of Coggshall Park was founded in 1992 when approximately $1 million in state and federal funds were used to renovate the park. Since the group's founding, the Friends have contributed significantly to the upkeep and beautification of Coggshall Park. Annual spring clean-up projects, to which the Friends contribute both volunteer labor and supplies (including more than 60 yards of mulch each year), ensure the park's landscaping remains well-kept. Other investments made by the Friends have been even more significant, such as the purchase of a new fountain for Mirror Lake and a specialized off-road firefighting vehicle for use in Coggshall or elsewhere around the city as needed.

Demographics

As of the census of 2010, there were 40,318 people, 15,165 households, and 9,362 families residing in the city. The racial makeup of the city was 78.2% White, 5.1% African American, 0.3% Native American, 3.6% Asian, 0.0% Pacific Islander, 9.1% from other races, and 3.7% from two or more races.
Hispanic or Latino of any race were 21.6% of the population (14.6% Puerto Rican, 1.8% Dominican, 1.6% Uruguayan, 1.4% Mexican, 0.3% Ecuadorian, 0.2% Colombian, 0.2% Honduran, 0.1% Guatemalan, 0.1% Salvadoran, 0.1% Spanish, 0.1% Peruvian). 
76.9% spoke English, 15.1% Spanish, 4.2% Other Indo-European Language and 2.6% Asian and Pacific Islander Languages as their first language.

There were 15,165 households, out of which 29.0% had children under the age of 18 living with them, 39.3% were married couples living together, 6.1% had a male householder with no wife present, 16.2% had a female householder with no husband present, and 38.3% were non-families. 29.8% of all households were made up of individuals. The average household size was 2.49 and the average family size was 3.10.

In the city, the population was spread out, with 22.9% under the age of 18, 14.1% from 18 to 24, 25.9% from 25 to 44, 24.7% from 45 to 64, and 12.4% who were 65 years of age or older. The median age was 34.7 years. For every 100 females, there were 94.5 males. For every 100 females age 18 and over, there were 92.3 males.

The median income for a household in the city was $47,019, and the median income for a family was $57,245. Males had a median income of $47,350 versus $37,921 for females. The per capita income for the city was $22,972. About 14.6% of families and 19.4% of the population were below the poverty line, including 27.3% of those under age 18 and 12.7% of those age 65 or over.

Government

Emergency services

Fire department

Fitchburg is protected year-round by the 98 paid professional firefighters of the City of Fitchburg Fire Department. The department operates out of 3 fire stations, located throughout the city, under the command of one deputy chief/shift commander per shift. The department operates a fleet of 3 engines, 1 tower ladder, 1 rescue, 1 special operations unit (Haz-Mat), 2 ambulances, 1 brush unit, 1 fireboat, 1 maintenance unit, 1 transport bus, and several other special support and reserve units, including 2 reserve engines, 1 reserve engine/tanker, 1 reserve tower ladder, and 1 reserve ambulance. The department is commanded by a chief of department, 4 deputy chiefs, 4 captains, and 14 lieutenants. The Fitchburg Fire Department responds to approximately 8,000 emergency calls annually. The current chief of department is Kevin D. Roy.

Below is a complete listing of all fire station locations and apparatus in Fitchburg.
Fire Headquarters – 33 North St.
Deputy Chief/Shift Commander
Rescue 1
Engine 3 (Reserve)
Engine 4
Engine 5 (Reserve)
Engine/Tanker 6 (Reserve)
Engine 7 (Brush Unit)
Tower Ladder 2 (Reserve)
Tower Ladder 3
Paramedic 3 (Reserve Ambulance)
Paramedic 1 (Ambulance)
Summer Street Station – 42 John Fitch Hwy.
Engine 1
 HazMat 63
Oak Hill Road Station – 231 Fairmount St.
Engine 2
Paramedic 2 (Ambulance)

Law enforcement

There are four law enforcement agencies that serve Fitchburg, two at the city level, one at the county level, and one at the state level.
 City level:
The department responds to over 40,000 incidents each year, while addressing the needs of a population of approximately 40,000 people in Central Massachusetts.
Fitchburg State University Campus Police – The Fitchburg State University Police Department includes a Chief, two Lieutenants, one Sergeant, fourteen full-time Police Officers, three full-time Dispatchers.  The police officers are fully trained, licensed, and armed as Special State Police Officers under Massachusetts General Law c.22c, 63 and c.73,18 as well as sworn Worcester County Deputy Sheriffs. In addition, in 2012 Fitchburg Mayor Lisa Wong swore in all FSUPD officers as Fitchburg special officers per request of the municipal police, expanding the campus police's ability to assist the city police. Officers possess full police powers and are responsible for the prevention of crime, the detection and apprehension of offenders, the preservation of public peace, and the enforcement of all criminal laws and state statues as well as compliance with the policies and regulations of the university.
County level:
Worcester County Sheriff's Office
State level:
Massachusetts State Police – The Massachusetts State Police (MSP) is an agency of the Commonwealth of Massachusetts' Executive Office of Public Safety and Security responsible for criminal law enforcement and traffic vehicle regulation across the state. At present, it has approximately 2,200 officers and 400 civilian support staff, making it the largest law enforcement agency in New England.

Medical care
There is a medical facility in Fitchburg, Hospital (Burbank Campus).  Fitchburg is also served by Hospital HealthAlliance (Leominster Campus), which is located in neighboring Leominster.

Library

The Fitchburg Public Library was established in 1859 after citizens of Fitchburg approved an article on the warrant requesting $1851 and quarters in the Town Hall for the first Fitchburg Public Library.

In 1885, Rodney Wallace built and furnished the Wallace Library and Art Gallery at the corner of Main Street and Newton Place as a gift to the people of Fitchburg. In 1899, a child-specific library service began in one of the country's first Children's rooms.  It was not until 1950 that a new separate Fitchburg Youth Library was opened.  Service of the library was increased with the purchase of a bookmobile which extended service to outlying areas of the city.

Fitchburg Public Library became the first regional library in the Massachusetts Regional Library System in 1962.

The existing Wallace Library, named for George R. Wallace, Jr. and his wife Alice G. who provided the library building, was dedicated in 1967. The Federal Library Services and Construction Act, money from the City of Fitchburg also funded the project and the Helen E. Vickery Fund provided a new bookmobile.

In fiscal year 2008, the city of Fitchburg spent 1.34% ($1,111,412) of its budget on its public library—approximately $27 per person. In fiscal year 2009, the city of Fitchburg spent .48% ($388,977) of its budget on its public library—$9.23 per person. This represented a year over year drop in municipal funding of 65% between FY2008 and FY2009. As a result, the Fitchburg Public Library did not meet Massachusetts minimum standards of public library services and was not certified by the Massachusetts Board of Library Commissioners for FY2009. It returned to certification in FY2012.

Furthermore, on going support comes from the Friends of the Fitchburg Public Library. The Friends of FPL establish closer relations between the library and the people it serves, promotes support of services, and funds several important services such purchasing books for the library and the fees for the museum passes.  The Friends work with area museums to bring library patrons Museum Passes that can be used to visit exhibits for reduced fees.

In 2014 the Fitchburg Law Library opened at the Fitchburg Public Library in response to the closure of the office on Elm Street in Fitchburg. The new library location is fully accessible and open to the public.

Education 

Elementary Schools:
 Crocker Elementary School
 South Street Elementary School
 Reingold Elementary School

Middle School:
 Memorial Middle School
Longsjo Middle School

High School:
 Fitchburg High School

High Schools of choice:
 Goodrich Academy
 McKay Arts Academy
 Montachusett Regional Vocational Technical School, also called Monty Tech
 Sizer School

Private schools

 Applewild School
 Notre Dame Preparatory School
 St. Bernard's Elementary School
 St. Bernard's Central Catholic High School

St. Anthony of Padua School opened  and closed in 2017. In its final year it had 144 students. Its closure meant that Fitchburg now has only one remaining Roman Catholic grade school.

Colleges and universities

 Fitchburg State University
Established in 1894 by an act of the Massachusetts Legislature, the State Normal School in Fitchburg opened in temporary quarters in the old high school building on Academy Street.

Transportation

Transportation for Fitchburg is largely supplied by the Montachusett Regional Transit Authority (MART). MART operates fixed-route bus services, shuttle services, as well as paratransit services within the Montachusett Region. It also provides two connections to the MBTA Commuter Rail line at Fitchburg Station and Wachusett Station. The Fitchburg Station is the second to last stop on the Fitchburg Line from the North Station in Boston and the Wachusett Station is the last stop.

In 1940, the airport land was donated to the City of Fitchburg and serves the greater Fitchburg area.

Business

Throughout the early twentieth century, Fitchburg was known for its paper industry, which occupied the banks of the Nashua River and employed a large segment of the European immigrant population. It has been noted by many residents in Fitchburg that the Nashua River would be dyed the color the paper mills had been coloring the paper that day.
 Founded in 1939, the Wachusett Potato Chip Company purchased the former County Jail buildings and grounds in the 1940s and has operated as a manufacturing and distributing facility for snack products since that time. It was purchased by UTZ in 2011 and still makes chips for local distribution using the Wachusett name.
 Two truck manufacturing firms, the Wachusett Truck Company and the New England Truck Company, operated in Fitchburg during the early twentieth century.
 Simonds International, Saw manufacturer founded in Fitchburg in 1832 and still operating on Intervale Road.
 The Iver Johnson Arms and Cycle Works made motorcycles for a short time, in addition to their primary products, firearms and bicycles.
 Assumption Life, a large financial services company, was founded in Fitchburg in 1903 before moving to Moncton, New Brunswick.
 Long time businesses that continued to grace Main Street are Shack's Clothing and Duvarney Jewelers.
 New businesses that have opened on Main Street are Tryst Lounge, and Strong Style Coffee a popular hang out and meeting place. 
 When completed in June 2014 Great Wolf Lodge New England will have spent over 70 million dollars in renovations to former Holiday Inn/Coco Key Water Resort There will be over 400 new permanent jobs created from this project.

Fitchburg Central Steam Plant

The Fitchburg Central Steam Plant (locally known by its nickname: the PLT) was built in 1928 to provide steam and electricity to the many local paper mills.  As the paper mills were abandoned or improved the Central Steam Plant fell into disuse and was abandoned.  In 2008, the EPA designated the Central Steam Plant a brownfield site due to contamination of the site soil and groundwater with metals and inorganic contaminants.  The EPA provided the City of Fitchburg $50,500 in grant money to help clean up hazardous substances on the site.

Cleanup of the Central Steam Plant started in 2010 and is ongoing as of July 2011. Unfortunately as of December 2015 the Fitchburg Central Steam Plant has been razed. The last structure to fall being the massive smokestack.

Recreation

Sports facilities

 Crocker Field – stadium and track field
 Wallace Civic Center – ice rink hosting youth hockey.

Parks

The Fitchburg Parks and Recreation Department maintains parks in Fitchburg.

Conservation land

Flat Rock Wild Life Sanctuary, a 326-acre wild life sanctuary that is part a network of Mass Aududon land, with 6 miles of trails. It is located within minutes from downtown Fitchburg, the hustling sounds of the city fade into a chorus of songbirds, rustling leaves, and zipping dragonflies. This wooded area provides habitat for species needing relatively large territories such as fisher, coyote, and red fox. Bobcat and black bear occasionally travel through these woods over rocky ledges and through hemlock groves.

West Fitchburg Steam Line Trail

The West Fitchburg Steam Line Trail is a bike and walking path located in Fitchburg on Route 2A.  It is 0.6 miles long and runs along the Nashua River and Flag Brook in the Waites Corner neighborhood.  The path is gravel and is relatively easy terrain. The trail is the first contracted part of a planned project to build a mixed use bike and walking trail through Fitchburg.  This trail will eventually connect with trails in the neighboring towns of Leominster and Westminster.  Additional parts of the proposed trail are in the Riverfront and Gateway Parks.

The Fitchburg Steam Line Trail is located near the junction of Route 31 (Princeton Rd) and Route 2A (Westminster St) at 465 Westminster Street. The trail parking lot is marked with signs, and is on the south side of 2A approximately ¼ mile East of Route 31. The parking lot can accommodate about 10–12 vehicles.

The trail starts to the left of the Fitchburg Central Steam Plant.

Media

Newspapers
 Raivaaja
 Sentinel & Enterprise
 Telegram & Gazette

Television
 Fitchburg has its own access TV station, Fitchburg Access Television. The station covers various local events, ranging from local school sports to municipal government meetings. FATV operates three Public, Education, and Government (PEG) channels. FATV channels can be viewed on Comcast (channels 8, 9, & 99) and on Verizon (channels 35, 36, & 37). FATV is not available on satellite TV.

Radio
 WPKZ, AM-1280 FM-105.3  Originally licensed in 1941
 WXPL, FM-91.3 Fitchburg State Radio
 WXLO, FM-104.5
 WQPH, FM-89.3 (Queen of Perpetual Help) Shirley/Fitchburg an EWTN Catholic Radio affiliate

Culture 
Fitchburg's cultural highlights include:
Arthur J. DiTommaso Memorial Bridge
 Fitchburg Art Museum
 Fitchburg Historical Society
 Fitchburg Longsjo Classic
 Fitchburg Military Band
 The Finnish Center at Saima Park
 Hammond Campus Center Art Gallery
 New Players Theatre Guild
 Riverfront Children's Theater
 Rollstone Studios
 Stratton Players
 Wallace Civic Center

In popular culture
In the fictional Harry Potter universe, Fitchburg is the hometown of the professional Quidditch team the Fitchburg Finches.

The McConnell Story, starring Alan Ladd has its opening in Fitchburg, and many scenes of June Allyson's character's family are in Fitchburg, as the movie progresses.

The opening scene in the popular 1961 movie, By Love Possessed, starring Lana Turner, Ephram Zimbalist Jr., Jason Robards, and George Hamilton, features Fitchburg's Court House and Monument Park.

The band Nirvana played a concert at the Wallace Civic Center in Fitchburg on November 11, 1993. According to lore, frontman Kurt Cobain bought a Martin D-18E Acoustic-Electric guitar at Salvatore Bros Great Music Box at 480 Main Street (now closed) which he famously played on the band's recording of MTV Unplugged In New York on November 18, 1993. This has since been dispelled by the store’s owner. 

In the 2012 Fringe episode "The Human Kind", FBI Agent Olivia Dunham goes to Fitchburg to retrieve an electromagnet.

In 2012, Dark Horse Comics began releasing an eight-issue limited comic book series entitled Falling Skies: The Battle of Fitchburg, with Paul Tobin writing and Juan Ferreyra as artist. The story takes place chronologically between seasons one and two of the Falling Skies television show, and details a costly engagement occurring between the skitters and the 2nd Massachusetts Militia Regiment when the aliens surround the human forces at Fitchburg, Massachusetts.

Notable people

 Joseph Palmer, beard enthusiast
 Herbert Adams, sculptor of "WWI, Winged Glory" in the Upper Common of Fitchburg
 Ameriie (Amerie Mi Marie Rogers), singer and actress
 Jacques Aubuchon, character actor 
 Mike Barnicle, newspaper writer
 Michael Beasley, NBA player, high school All-American; attended Notre Dame Preparatory School
 Orlando Boss, Medal of Honor recipient from the American Civil War
 Ken Bouchard, former NASCAR driver, 1988 NASCAR Winston Cup Rookie of the Year
 Ron Bouchard, former NASCAR driver, 1981 NASCAR Winston Cup Rookie of the Year, former owner of many car dealerships
 Everett Francis Briggs,  Catholic priest and miners' activist, born in Fitchburg, his life's mission was dedicated to the victims of the Monongah Mining Disaster
 Carolyn Brown,  dancer, choreographer, and writer, danced with Merce Cunningham Dance Company 
 Henry Sweetser Burrage, clergyman, editor, author, Maine historian 
 James "Nixey" Callahan, Major League Baseball pitcher around the turn of the 20th century, later manager of the Chicago White Sox 
 Herbert William Conn, zoologist and bacteriologist
 Marcus A. Coolidge, United States Senator
 Alvah Crocker, manufacturer and railroad promoter, United States Representative
 George Crowther, football player
 Donald Featherstone, artist and creator of the plastic flamingo lawn ornament
 Ryan Gomes, NBA player; attended Notre Dame Preparatory School
 Bruce Gordon, actor (Ishtar, Adam-12, Bonanza, Get Smart, and The Untouchables)
Samuel W. Hale, member of the New Hampshire House of Representatives and the 39th Governor of New Hampshire
 Christian Hansen Jr., U.S. Marshal for Vermont
 Ripley Hitchcock, prominent editor
 Lempi Ikävalko, Finnish-born poet, author, journalist; for 30 years, editor at Fitchburg's Raivaaja newspaper
 Viola Léger, American-born Canadian actress and politician 
 Louise Freeland Jenkins, astronomer
 Iver Johnson, of Iver Johnson's Arms & Cycle Works, located in Fitchburg
 Erika Lawler, member of the 2009–10 United States national women's ice hockey team
Ray LeBlanc, ice hockey goaltender
John Legere, CEO of T-Mobile US
 Art Longsjo, Winter and Summer Olympian; Fitchburg Longsjo Classic is held in his memory
 Caroline Atherton Mason, poet
 Matti Mattson, American labor organizer, social activist, and Veteran of the Abraham Lincoln Brigade in the Spanish Civil War
 Hiram Maxim, inventor of the first self-powered machine gun
 Patricia Misslin, voice teacher and soprano
 Pat Moran, catcher and manager in Major League Baseball, managed the Philadelphia Phillies and the 1919 World Series champion Cincinnati Reds
 Clara Hapgood Nash (1839–1921), first woman to be admitted to the bar in New England; born in Fitchburg
 George Noory, host of Coast to Coast AM; spent some years in Fitchburg and occasionally mentions the city on his show
 Eleanor Norcross, founder of the Fitchburg Art Museum, artist, collector, social reformer
 Joseph Pilato, actor most known for Day of the Dead
 Marion Rice, Denishawn dancer, teacher, choreographer, producer
 Charles L. Robinson, physician, journalist and first governor of Kansas
 Sylvanus Sawyer, inventor and manufacturer 
 Asa Thurston, Hawaiian missionary 
 Oskari Tokoi, editor of Raivaaja
 Calvin M. Woodward, St. Louis educator 
 Samuel Worcester, clergyman noted for his participation in a controversy over Unitarianism

Twin towns – sister cities

 Kleve, North Rhine-Westphalia, Germany
 Kokkola, Finland
 Tianjin, China
 Oni, Georgia

See also
 Fitchburg Trappers
 Liberté de Fitchburg
 List of mill towns in Massachusetts

References

External links

 
 Fitchburg Historical Society
 Fitchburg Economic Development Office
 Fitchburg in 1885, article in the Bay State Monthly, from Project Gutenberg
 

	

 
Cities in Worcester County, Massachusetts
Populated places established in 1730
1730 establishments in Massachusetts
Cities in Massachusetts